Muawiya, Al Hassan wa al Hussein or Al-Hassan wa Al-Hussain is a 2011 Arab television drama series based on the lives of Hasan ibn Ali and Husain Ibn Ali. It revolves around the two grandsons of the Islamic prophet Muhammad, Hassan and Hussein, and their relationship with their companions, sedition that occurred between them and their companions after the killing of Usman ibn Affan. It shows alleged Jewish conspiracies through the personality of Abdullah bin Saba, and his role in stirring sedition.

The series is a co-production among Qatari, Syrian, Kuwaiti, Moroccan and Jordanian elements. It deals with the epic strife that created a rift across the Islamic Ummah. The period extends from the beginning of the sedition, after the martyrdom of Caliph Uthman bin Affan, through the assumption of Ali, the martyrdom of Ali and Hassan, and the concession of Hassan and take over of Muawiya. Hussein in Karbala deals with the serial events of the battle of the two sentences. The series caused a sensation when it objected to the issuance of many religious scholars and Shiites and was boycotted by the Iraqi government and banned from Iraqi channels.

Cast
 Rashid Assaf: Muawiya bin Abi Sufyan.
 Khaled Al-Guwairy: Hassan ibn Ali.
 Mohammed al-Majali: Hussein ibn Ali.
 Fares Al-Helou: Abdullah ibn Saba.
 Taysir Idris: Malik al-Ashtar.
 Fathi al-Haddaoui: Hurqus ibn Zuhayr.
 Talhat Hamdi: Zubayr ibn al-Awwam.
 Zinati Holy: Adi bin Hatim.
 Riyad Wardiani: Talha bin Ubaidillah.
 Mohammed al-Qabbani: Amr ibn al-Aas.
 Jamil Brahman: Abdullah ibn Umar.
 Abdullah Bahman: Zaid bin Umar.
 Abdul Rahman Abu al-Qasim: Abu Hurayrah.
 Akif Najm: Ammar bin Yasir.
 Taj Haider: Zainab bint Ali.
 Lina Hawarneh: Fatima bint Ali.
 Hisham Henedi: voice of Uthman ibn Affan.
 Karim Mohsen: voice of Ali ibn Abi Talib.
 Hisham Bahloul: Muslim bin Aqeel.
 Qashim Melho: Al-Hurr ibn Yazid al Tamimi.
 Yasser Abdul Latif: Najjashi.

Islamic scholars' support
Al-Maha Company issued a fatwa concerning the permissibility of the depiction of the companions of the prophet Muhammad including Hassan and Hussain, signed by a group of scholars, including:
 Yusuf Al-Qaradawi
 Abdul Wahab bin Nasser Al-Turayri
 Khalid bin Abdullah Al-Musleh
 The Fatwa Sector, Ministry of Awqaf and Islamic Affairs - Kuwait

The Department of Ifta Ministry of Awqaf in the Syria officially approved the text of the series. The script was reviewed by scholars under the supervision of Sheikh Hassan Husseini. They include the following:

 Ali Al-Salabi.
 Mohammed Al-Barzanji.
 Mohammed Mahfil.
 Khalid Al-Ghaith.

See also 

List of Islamic films

References

External links
 
 Official youtube page

Syrian historical television series
Arabic-language television shows
2011 television series debuts
2011 television series endings
2011 television specials
Television series about Islam
Cultural depictions of Husayn ibn Ali